Samuel Powell (25 May 1899–1961) was an English footballer who played in the Football League for Leeds United and The Wednesday.

References

1899 births
1961 deaths
English footballers
Association football forwards
English Football League players
Rotherham County F.C. players
Leeds United F.C. players
Sheffield Wednesday F.C. players
Stafford Rangers F.C. players